The following is a list of panel paintings, works on canvas and frescoes by the Italian painter Sandro Botticelli. The few surviving drawings are excluded. It is not indicated if some works might be executed with more or less participation by his workshop.

See also
 Divine Comedy illustrated by Botticelli

References 

Botticelli